Lieutenant-Colonel Thomas George Montgomerie FRS (1830–1878) was a British surveyor who participated in the Great Trigonometric Survey of India as a lieutenant in the 1850s. He was the person to label K2, the second highest mountain in the world, the K standing for Karakoram.

Despite being often denied close range access, the 19th-century survey work carried out by Montgomerie and the survey of India has been shown to be accurate. The elevations of major summits which they calculated are very close to the elevations which are accepted today.

He was subsequently involved in attempts to extend the survey of India into Tibet. Tibet was not part of the British Empire and was closed to foreigners, so he employed and trained Indians, who entered Tibet disguised as travelling Tibetans, and became known as pundits.

In 1867 Major Montgomerie was assigned to Peshawar where he was tasked with recruiting native agents to explore Central Asia. Montgomerie recruited a number of individuals to survey Chitral and Badakhshan, including Hyder Shah, who in 1870 travelled through the princely states of Swat and Dir and Badakhshan.

List of publications
 T. G. Montgomerie, "A Havildar's Journey through Chitral to Faizabad in 1870," Journal of the Royal Geographical Society of London. vol. 42, 1872, pp. 180–201
 Lieut.-Col. T. G. Montgomerie, "Journey to Shigatze, in Tibet and Return by Dingri-Maidan into Nepaul in 1871, by the native Explorer No. 9" Journal of the Royal Geographical Society of London, 1876
 Lieut.-Col. T. G. Montgomerie, "Narrative of an Exploration of the Namcho, or Tengri nur Lake in Great Tibet made by a native Explorer during 1871–2" Journal of the Royal Geographical Society of London, 1876
 Lieut.-Col. T. G. Montgomerie, "Journey from Pitoragarh, In Kumaon, via Jumlah, to Tadum and back, along the Kali Gandak to British Territory" Journal of the Royal Geographical Society of London, 1876

References

External links
 
 Rediscovering Nain Singh

1830 births
1878 deaths
Royal Engineers officers
British surveyors
British East India Company Army officers
Central Asian studies scholars
Fellows of the Royal Society